Joseph Henry Petty (August 20, 1826 New York City – February 9, 1901 Amityville, Suffolk County, New York) was an American politician from New York.

Life
He was the son of Ezekiel Petty (1789–1853) and Elizabeth Petty (1791–1874). About 1853, he married Catharine Van Buren (ca. 1834–ca. 1919), and they had three children.

He was a member of the New York State Assembly (New York Co., 11th D.) in 1855.

He was a member of the New York State Senate (4th D.) in 1856 and 1857.

He joined the New York Metropolitan Police, and retired as a captain. He was commended for bravery during the New York City draft riots of 1863, and the Orange Riots of 1873.

He was buried at the Oakwood Cemetery in Amityville.

Sources
The New York Civil List compiled by Franklin Benjamin Hough (pages 137, 144, 249 and 297; Weed, Parsons and Co., 1858)
DEATH LIST OF A DAY; Joseph H. Petty in NYT on February 10, 1901
Petty genealogy at Long Island Surnames

1826 births
1901 deaths
Members of the New York State Assembly
New York (state) state senators
New York (state) Know Nothings
19th-century American politicians
Politicians from New York City
People from Amityville, New York